The dynastic crisis of the Kingdom of Romania began in December 1925, when Prince Carol II stated he would renounce his rights to the throne, and ended in June 1930, when he deposed his young son and took the throne for himself.

Notes

Kingdom of Romania
Political history of Romania
1925 in Romania
1930 in Romania